Callaeum is a genus in the Malpighiaceae, a family of about 75 genera of flowering plants in the order Malpighiales. Callaeum comprises 11 species of woody vines and shrubs occurring from western Texas to Mexico, Central America, and South America. Two species, C. macropterum and C. septentrionale are cultivated as ornamentals in Arizona and California.

Species

References

Malpighiaceae Malpighiaceae - description, taxonomy, phylogeny, and nomenclature
Callaeum
Anderson, W. R. 2006a. A new species of Callaeum (Malpighiacee) from Puebla, Mexico. Acta Botanica Mexicana 74: 179–183.
Johnson, D. M. Revision of the Neotropical Genus Callaeum (Malpighiaceae). Systematic Botany 11: 335–353.

Malpighiaceae
Malpighiaceae genera